Macrocheilus chaudoiri is a species of ground beetle in the subfamily Anthiinae. It was described by Andrewes in 1919.

References

Anthiinae (beetle)
Beetles described in 1919